The 1953 Hardin–Simmons Cowboys football team was an American football team that represented Hardin–Simmons University in the Border Conference during the 1953 college football season. In its second season under head coach Murray Evans, the team compiled a 6–5 record (4–1 against conference opponents), finished in second place in the conference, and was outscored by a total of 211 to 199. The team played its home games at Parramore Field, also known as Parramore Stadium, in Abilene, Texas.

Two Hardin-Simmons players were named to the 1953 All-Border Conference football team: end D.C. Andrews; and center Sam Walker.

Schedule

References

Hardin-Simmons
Hardin–Simmons Cowboys football seasons
Hardin-Simmons Cowboys football